The Beijing underground cross-city railway is a short railway connection in Beijing. The speed limit is 120 km/h. It connects the important transportation hubs Beijing railway station and Beijing West railway station via a tunnel. It also connects lines from southern and western areas with lines from northeast China.

It is used by conventional railway lines such as K7752 from Shijiazhuang to Chengde via Beijing West railway station and Beijing railway station. It is also used by the commuter rail service in Beijing, the Sub-Central line of the Beijing Suburban Railway, which started in December 2017.

History
In the early 1980s a plan was proposed to connect Beijing railway station to Beijing West railway station via a conventional railway. This was an important part of the overall planning of Beijing West railway station's renovation, originally announced as part of the "Eighth Five-Year Plan". However, due to technical difficulties and other factors, this project did not begin.

 December 24, 2005: A proposal was made with the aim of completing the construction within 2.5 years, in time for the 2008 Beijing Olympic Games. However, in 2007, the project was delayed and couldn't be completed before the Beijing Olympics.
 July 2013: The construction project was successfully completed 
 December 19, 2014: The line passed static inspection. 
 December 30, 2014: Test trains tested on the tracks. 
 March 20, 2015: Beijing underground cross-city railway officially opened with the first trains running from Shijiazhuang to Chengde (K7742/7743, K7744/7741) train.
 May 15, 2016: Train Z621/622 and Z721/722 Beijing–Lhasa trains, and trains from Shenyang North railway station / Changchun railway station to Beijing West railway station, started to use the tunnel to travel from Beijing–Guangzhou Railway to Beijing–Harbin Railway.
 December 31, 2017: The commuter rail service in Beijing, the Sub-Central line of the Beijing Suburban Railway, started to use Beijing underground cross-city railway by CRH6A. The Sub-Central line runs from Beijing West railway station to Tongzhou railway station.
 October 11, 2022: Trains G7812/7813, G7814/7811 (Chengde South - Handan East) and G7816/7817, G7818/7815 (Chengde South - Shijiazhuang) started to use the tunnel, linking Beijing-Harbin HSR and Beijing-Guangzhou HSR.

Construction
 Construction Unit: Beijing Railway Bureau
 Construction Unit: China Railway Liu Ju Group Limited, China Railway 16 Bureau Group Co., Ltd., China Railway Bureau Group, a company tunnel
 Designer: Third Railway Survey and Design Institute
 Supervisor: Academy of Railway Sciences Engineering Construction Supervision Department, China Railway Engineering Consulting Corporation, Beijing Railway Construction Engineering Co. Ltd.

Main technical standards
 Railroad grade: I level
 Number of main lines: Double
 Minimum curve radius: General area 800 meters, 550 meters in difficult sections
 Limiting gradient: 1.6%
 Effective train length: 650 m
 Type of traction: Electric traction
 Rolling stock: HXD3D, SS9, CRH6
 Block type: Automatic block

Notelist

References

Rail transport in Beijing
Standard gauge railways in China
Railway lines opened in 2015